In mathematics, homogeneous coordinates or projective coordinates, introduced by August Ferdinand Möbius in his 1827 work , are a system of coordinates used in projective geometry, just as Cartesian coordinates are used in Euclidean geometry. They have the advantage that the coordinates of points, including points at infinity, can be represented using finite coordinates. Formulas involving homogeneous coordinates are often simpler and more symmetric than their Cartesian counterparts. Homogeneous coordinates have a range of applications, including computer graphics and 3D computer vision, where they allow affine transformations and, in general, projective transformations to be easily represented by a matrix.

If homogeneous coordinates of a point are multiplied by a non-zero scalar then the resulting coordinates represent the same point. Since homogeneous coordinates are also given to points at infinity, the number of coordinates required to allow this extension is one more than the dimension of the projective space being considered. For example, two homogeneous coordinates are required to specify a point on the projective line and three homogeneous coordinates are required to specify a point in the projective plane.

Introduction
The real projective plane can be thought of as the Euclidean plane with additional points added, which are called points at infinity, and are considered to lie on a new line, the line at infinity. There is a point at infinity corresponding to each direction (numerically given by the slope of a line), informally defined as the limit of a point that moves in that direction away from the origin. Parallel lines in the Euclidean plane are said to intersect at a point at infinity corresponding to their common direction. Given a point  on the Euclidean plane, for any non-zero real number Z, the triple  is called a set of homogeneous coordinates for the point. By this definition, multiplying the three homogeneous coordinates by a common, non-zero factor gives a new set of homogeneous coordinates for the same point. In particular,  is such a system of homogeneous coordinates for the point .
The original Cartesian coordinates are recovered by dividing the first two positions by the third. Thus unlike Cartesian coordinates, a single point can be represented by infinitely many homogeneous coordinates.

The equation of a line through the origin  may be written  where n and m are not both 0. In parametric form this can be written . Let Z = 1/t, so the coordinates of a point on the line may be written . In homogeneous coordinates this becomes . In the limit, as t approaches infinity, in other words, as the point moves away from the origin, Z approaches 0 and the homogeneous coordinates of the point become . Thus we define  as the homogeneous coordinates of the point at infinity corresponding to the direction of the line . As any line of the Euclidean plane is parallel to a line passing through the origin, and since parallel lines have the same point at infinity, the infinite point on every line of the Euclidean plane has been given homogeneous coordinates.

To summarize:
Any point in the projective plane is represented by a triple , called homogeneous coordinates or projective coordinates of the point, where X, Y and Z are not all 0. 
The point represented by a given set of homogeneous coordinates is unchanged if the coordinates are multiplied by a common factor.
Conversely, two sets of homogeneous coordinates represent the same point if and only if one is obtained from the other by multiplying all the coordinates by the same non-zero constant.
When Z is not 0 the point represented is the point  in the Euclidean plane.
When Z is 0 the point represented is a point at infinity.
The triple  is omitted and does not represent any point.

Notation
Some authors use different notations for homogeneous coordinates which help distinguish them from Cartesian coordinates. Square brackets, as in  emphasize that multiple sets of coordinates are associated with a single point. Some authors use a combination of colons and square brackets, as in [x:y:z].

Other dimensions
The discussion in the preceding section applies analogously to projective spaces other than the plane. So the points on the projective line may be represented by pairs of coordinates , not both zero. Similarly the points in projective n-space are represented by (n + 1)-tuples.

Other projective spaces
The use of real numbers gives homogeneous coordinates of points in the classical case of the real projective spaces, however any field may be used, in particular, the complex numbers may be used for complex projective space. For example, the complex projective line uses two homogeneous complex coordinates and is known as the Riemann sphere. Other fields, including finite fields, can be used.

Homogeneous coordinates for projective spaces can also be created with elements from a division ring (a skew field). However, in this case, care must be taken to account for the fact that multiplication may not be commutative.

For the general ring A, a projective line over A can be defined with homogeneous factors acting on the left and the projective linear group acting on the right.

Alternative definition
Another definition of the real projective plane can be given in terms of equivalence classes. For non-zero elements of R3, define  to mean there is a non-zero λ so that . Then ~ is an equivalence relation and the projective plane can be defined as the equivalence classes of  If  is one of the elements of the equivalence class p then these are taken to be homogeneous coordinates of p.

Lines in this space are defined to be sets of solutions of equations of the form  where not all of a, b and c are zero. Satisfaction of the condition  depends only on the equivalence class of  so the equation defines a set of points in the projective plane. The equation  is an equation of a line in the projective plane (see definition of a line in the projective plane), and is called the line at infinity.

The equivalence classes, p, are the lines through the origin with the origin removed. The origin does not really play an essential part in the previous discussion so it can be added back in without changing the properties of the projective plane. This produces a variation on the definition, namely the projective plane is defined as the set of lines in R3 that pass through the origin and the coordinates of a non-zero element  of a line are taken to be homogeneous coordinates of the line. These lines are now interpreted as points in the projective plane.

Again, this discussion applies analogously to other dimensions. So the projective space of dimension n can be defined as the set of lines through the origin in Rn+1.

Homogeneity
Homogeneous coordinates are not uniquely determined by a point, so a function defined on the coordinates, say , does not determine a function defined on points as with Cartesian coordinates. But a condition  defined on the coordinates, as might be used to describe a curve, determines a condition on points if the function is homogeneous. Specifically, suppose there is a k such that

If a set of coordinates represents the same point as  then it can be written  for some non-zero value of λ. Then

A polynomial  of degree k can be turned into a homogeneous polynomial by replacing x with x/z, y with y/z and multiplying by zk, in other words by defining

The resulting function f is a polynomial, so it makes sense to extend its domain to triples where . The process can be reversed by setting , or

For example, the homogeneous form of the equation of the line  is

Line coordinates and duality

The equation of a line in the projective plane may be given as  where s, t and u are constants. Each triple  determines a line, the line determined is unchanged if it is multiplied by a non-zero scalar, and at least one of s, t and u must be non-zero. So the triple  may be taken to be homogeneous coordinates of a line in the projective plane, that is line coordinates as opposed to point coordinates. If in sx + ty + uz = 0 the letters s, t and u are taken as variables and x, y and z are taken as constants then the equation becomes an equation of a set of lines in the space of all lines in the plane. Geometrically it represents the set of lines that pass through the point  and may be interpreted as the equation of the point in line-coordinates. In the same way, planes in 3-space may be given sets of four homogeneous coordinates, and so on for higher dimensions.

The same relation, may be regarded as either the equation of a line or the equation of a point. In general, there is no difference either algebraically or logically between homogeneous coordinates of points and lines. So plane geometry with points as the fundamental elements and plane geometry with lines as the fundamental elements are equivalent except for interpretation. This leads to the concept of duality in projective geometry, the principle that the roles of points and lines can be interchanged in a theorem in projective geometry and the result will also be a theorem. Analogously, the theory of points in projective 3-space is dual to the theory of planes in projective 3-space, and so on for higher dimensions.

Plücker coordinates

Assigning coordinates to lines in projective 3-space is more complicated since it would seem that a total of 8 coordinates, either the coordinates of two points which lie on the line or two planes whose intersection is the line, are required. The Plücker embedding is the generalization of this to create homogeneous coordinates of elements of any dimension m in a projective space of dimension n.

Application to Bézout's theorem
Bézout's theorem predicts that the number of points of intersection of two curves is equal to the product of their degrees (assuming an algebraically closed field and with certain conventions followed for counting intersection multiplicities). Bézout's theorem predicts there is one point of intersection of two lines and in general this is true, but when the lines are parallel the point of intersection is infinite. Homogeneous coordinates are used to locate the point of intersection in this case. Similarly, Bézout's theorem predicts that a line will intersect a conic at two points, but in some cases one or both of the points is infinite and homogeneous coordinates must be used to locate them. For example,  and  have only one point of intersection in the finite (affine) plane. This first solution is the point  in Cartesian coordinates, the finite point of intersection. The second solution gives the homogeneous coordinates  which corresponds to the direction of the y-axis. For the equations  and  there are no finite points of intersection. From the original equation, so  since at least one coordinate must be non-zero. Therefore,  is the point of intersection counted with multiplicity 2 in agreement with the theorem.

Circular points

The intersection of this curve with the line at infinity can be found by setting . These points are called the circular points at infinity and can be regarded as the common points of intersection of all circles. This can be generalized to curves of higher order as circular algebraic curves.

Change of coordinate systems
Just as the selection of axes in the Cartesian coordinate system is somewhat arbitrary, the selection of a single system of homogeneous coordinates out of all possible systems is somewhat arbitrary. Therefore, it is useful to know how the different systems are related to each other.

Let  be homogeneous coordinates of a point in the projective plane. A fixed matrix

with nonzero determinant, defines a new system of coordinates  by the equation

So  are a new system of homogeneous coordinates for the same point of the projective plane.

Barycentric coordinates

Möbius's original formulation of homogeneous coordinates specified the position of a point as the center of mass (or barycenter) of a system of three point masses placed at the vertices of a fixed triangle. Points within the triangle are represented by positive masses and points outside the triangle are represented by allowing negative masses. Multiplying the masses in the system by a scalar does not affect the center of mass, so this is a special case of a system of homogeneous coordinates.

Trilinear coordinates

Let l, m, n be three lines in the plane and define a set of coordinates X, Y and Z of a point p as the signed distances from p to these three lines. These are called the trilinear coordinates of p with respect to the triangle whose vertices are the pairwise intersections of the lines. Strictly speaking these are not homogeneous, since the values of X, Y and Z are determined exactly, not just up to proportionality. More generally, X, Y and Z can be defined as constants p, r and q times the distances to l, m and n, resulting in a different system of homogeneous coordinates with the same triangle of reference. This is, in fact, the most general type of system of homogeneous coordinates for points in the plane if none of the lines is the line at infinity.

Use in computer graphics and computer vision

Homogeneous coordinates are ubiquitous in computer graphics because they allow common vector operations such as translation, rotation, scaling and perspective projection to be represented as a matrix by which the vector is multiplied. By the chain rule, any sequence of such operations can be multiplied out into a single matrix, allowing simple and efficient processing. By contrast, using Cartesian coordinates, translations and perspective projection cannot be expressed as matrix multiplications, though other operations can. Modern OpenGL and Direct3D graphics cards take advantage of homogeneous coordinates to implement a vertex shader efficiently using vector processors with 4-element registers.

For example, in perspective projection, a position in space is associated with the line from it to a fixed point called the center of projection. The point is then mapped to a plane by finding the point of intersection of that plane and the line. This produces an accurate representation of how a three-dimensional object appears to the eye. In the simplest situation, the center of projection is the origin and points are mapped to the plane , working for the moment in Cartesian coordinates. Dropping the now superfluous z coordinate, this becomes .

Matrices representing other geometric transformations can be combined with this and each other by matrix multiplication. As a result, any perspective projection of space can be represented as a single matrix.

Notes

References

Further reading

External links

 Jules Bloomenthal and Jon Rokne, Homogeneous coordinates  
 Ching-Kuang Shene, Homogeneous coordinates 
 Wolfram MathWorld

Linear algebra
Projective geometry
1827 in science